Omps may refer to:

 Omps, Cantal, a commune in the French department of Cantal
 Omps, West Virginia, an unincorporated community
 Ozone Mapping and Profiler Suite, a suite of instruments measuring stratospheric ozone distribution

See also
OMP (disambiguation)